A padlock is a simple detachable lock with a hinged or sliding shackle.

Padlock may also refer to:

 The Padlock, a comic opera by Isaac Bickerstaffe and Charles Dibdin
 Padlock, a 1985 EP by Gwen Guthrie
 VIA PadLock, a security co-processor by VIA Technologies integrated in some of their CPUs
 The Padlock (Italian fairy tale), Italian literary fairy tale from the Pentamerone

See also
Padlocked, a 1926 silent film